Lauritz Christiansen (27 December 1892 – 4 October 1976) was a Danish athlete. He competed in the men's individual cross country event at the 1912 Summer Olympics.

References

1892 births
1976 deaths
Athletes (track and field) at the 1912 Summer Olympics
Danish male long-distance runners
Olympic athletes of Denmark
Athletes from Copenhagen
Olympic cross country runners